Rallou Manou (1915-1988) was a noted Greek choreographer, modern dancer and dance teacher.

Early life and ancestry
She was daughter of Colonel Petros Manos, aide-de-camp of King Constantine I of Greece and his second wife Sofia Tombazis (daughter of Alexandros Tombazis and Princess Maria Mavrocordato). She was half-sister of Aspasia Manos, aunt of Queen Alexandra of Yugoslavia and great-aunt of Alexander, Crown Prince of Yugoslavia. Through her other half-sister Roxanne, she was sister in law of an athlete and industrialist Christos Zalokostas.

Later life
She contributed to the development of postwar Greek dance. In 1951, she founded the Hellenic Choreodrama, a group that presented dance-dramas based on Ancient Greek literature. Her works were often performed at the Odeon of Herodes Atticus of Athens. She collaborated with the Greek composers Manos Hadjidakis, Mikis Theodorakis, George Sicilianos and Giorgos Tsangaris. She also collaborated with the Egyptian-born composer Halim El-Dabh, who composed the music for her dance-drama Doxastiko (1965). The sets and costumes of her choreographies were designed by noted Greek artists such a Yiannis Tsarouchis, Nikos Engonopoulos, Nikos Nikolaou, Nikos Hadjikyriakos-Ghikas and Spyros Vassiliou.

Personal life
She was married to the prominent Greek architect Pavlos Mylonas.

Death
She died on 15 October 1988. Her husband Pavlos outlived her for 17 years.

References
Cohen, Selma Jeanne (1967). "A Meeting With Rallou Manou." Dance Magazine, June 1965, p. 57.
Manou, Rallou (1961). Helleniko chorodrama, 1950-1960. Athens: s.n.,
Manou, Rallou (1987). Choros: "--ou ton radion--ousan ten technen--". Athens: Ekdoseis "Gnose".
Manou, Rallou (1988). Choros: "--ou ton radion--ousan ten technen--". 2nd ed. Athens: Ekdoseis "Gnose."
Stamatopoulou-Vasilakou, Chrysothemis (2006). Archeio Rallous Manou: he zoe kai to ergo tes (The Rallou Manou Archive: Her Life and Work). Athens: Ekdoseis Ephesos. . .

External links
Rallou Manou article
Rallou Manou page
Rallou Manou article (Greek)

Greek choreographers
1915 births
1988 deaths
Place of birth missing
20th-century Greek women artists